Noja is a municipality located in the autonomous community of Cantabria, Spain.
 
It has 2 beaches, "Trengandin" and "Ris".

References

Municipalities in Cantabria